Simon Coveney (born 16 June 1972) is an Irish Fine Gael politician who has served as Minister for Enterprise, Trade and Employment since December 2022 and Deputy Leader of Fine Gael since 2017. He previously served as Minister for Foreign Affairs and Minister for Defence from 2020 to 2022. He has served as a Teachta Dála (TD) for the Cork South-Central constituency since 1998. He previously served as Tánaiste from 2017 to 2020, Minister for Housing, Planning, Community and Local Government from 2016 to 2017 and Minister for Agriculture, Food and the Marine from 2011 to 2016. He also served as a Member of the European Parliament (MEP) for the South constituency from 2004 to 2007.

He was elected to Dáil Éireann in a by-election in 1998, following the death of his father Hugh Coveney.

After the formation of the coalition government in March 2011, Coveney was appointed Minister for Agriculture, Food and the Marine. Following a cabinet reshuffle in July 2014, which saw him also take over the position of Minister for Defence. On the formation of a Fine Gael minority government in May 2016, he was appointed Minister for Housing, Planning, Community and Local Government. In June 2017, after Leo Varadkar succeeded Enda Kenny as Taoiseach, Coveney was appointed as Minister for Foreign Affairs and Trade and Deputy Leader of Fine Gael. He was appointed Tánaiste (deputy prime minister) in November 2017, following the resignation of Frances Fitzgerald. As part of the new government formed following the 2020 general election, Coveney was appointed Minister for Foreign Affairs and Defence in the new cabinet.

Early life
Coveney was born in Cork in 1972 to Hugh Coveney and Pauline Coveney. He has 5 brothers and 1 sister. His father was a chartered quantity surveyor and later a TD, and also a member of one of the famous merchant families in the city. His uncle was Archbishop Patrick Coveney. Simon was educated locally in Cork, before later attending Clongowes Wood College, County Kildare. He was expelled from the college in Transition Year but ultimately was invited back to complete his full six years there. He repeated his Leaving Certificate in Bruce College in Cork. Coveney subsequently attended University College Cork and Gurteen Agricultural College, before completing a BSc in Agriculture and Land Management from Royal Agricultural College, Gloucestershire. In 1997/8, he led the “Sail Chernobyl Project” which involved sailing a boat 30,000 miles around the world and raising €650,000 for charity. He spent several years working as an agriculture adviser and farm manager.

Political career

Early years in Dáil Éireann: 1998–2004
Coveney was elected to Dáil Éireann as a Fine Gael candidate for Cork South-Central in a by-election, caused by the death of his father in 1998. In spite of being a strong supporter of party leader John Bruton, he remained on the backbenches for a number of years.

In 2001, discipline in the parliamentary party broke down and Coveney came out against Bruton in a leadership heave. His loss of support was a surprise and encouraged others to vote against Bruton. The subsequent leadership contest was won by Michael Noonan and a new front bench was put in place.

After an initial period on the backbenches, Coveney was promoted to the Front Bench by Michael Noonan, as deputy chief whip.

Coveney was re-elected at the 2002 general election, in what turned out to be a disaster for Fine Gael. The party lost twenty-three seats and some of its most important party figures. Noonan was replaced as party leader by Enda Kenny, who promoted Coveney to the position of Spokesperson on Communications, Marine and Natural Resources, in his new front bench.

Member of the European Parliament: 2004–2007
Coveney was elected to the European Parliament for the South constituency, in the 2004 European Parliament election. During his three years as an MEP, Coveney held the position of human rights co-ordinator for the largest political group in the European Parliament, the European People's Party, and twice authored the Parliament's Annual Report on Human Rights in the world. He spearheaded the Stop the Traffic campaign at the European Parliament. He was a member of the Foreign Affairs Committee and the Delegation for Relations with the United States and a substitute on the Human Rights Subcommittee, Fisheries Committee, Internal Market and Consumer Protection Committee and the Delegation for Relations with Iran.

Return to the Dáil: 2007–2011
Coveney returned to Ireland to contest the 2007 general election. He was successful in being returned to the Dáil, as a result, he stepped down as a Member of the European Parliament. He was replaced in the European Parliament by Colm Burke.

Fine Gael won back many of the seats that the party had lost five years earlier; however, they still fell short of forming a coalition government with the Labour Party. Coveney returned to the party's front bench as Spokesperson on Communications, Energy and Natural Resources.

In June 2010, Coveney and a number of other front bench Spokespersons stated that they had no confidence in their party leader, Enda Kenny. A subsequent confidence motion in the leader was won by Kenny. Coveney was re-appointed to the front bench as Spokesperson on Transport.

Minister for Agriculture, Food and the Marine: 2011–2016
On 9 March 2011, Coveney was appointed Minister for Agriculture, Food and the Marine, in the new Fine Gael-Labour Party coalition government.

He attended his first meeting of EU Agriculture Ministers, in Brussels on 17 March 2011.

Coveney provoked controversy when, in September 2011, he flew to Algeria, on the government jet at a cost of more than €26,000 to the Irish taxpayer when there were flights available for €16,331. While there, Coveney cut a ribbon at the opening of a supermarket in Oran.

In May 2014, Coveney attended a meeting of the Bilderberg Group, in Copenhagen.

Minister for Defence: 2014–2016

On 11 July 2014, Coveney was also appointed as Minister for Defence, in a cabinet reshuffle, following the resignation of Eamon Gilmore as Tánaiste. He took over from Taoiseach Enda Kenny, who was the acting Minister for Defence, following Alan Shatter's resignation from cabinet, in May 2014. As Minister for Defence, Coveney launched the White Paper on Defence in August 2015.

On 17 June 2015, Coveney questioned the judgment of an experienced Air Corps pilot who refused to fly him to Cork, because of predicted fog. In email correspondence between Department of Defence officials, the Air Corps is described as being "very unhappy" about the incident and indicating that they had never received such a call in 25 years."

In January 2017 it emerged that a number of Air Corps whistleblowers had attempted to contact Coveney while he was Defence Minister over their concerns about the adverse health impacts of chemicals used to service the force's aircraft. The whistleblowers had complained about being unable to speak to Coveney about the issue, however Coveney claimed he was "not aware of there being any problem with hearing from, or talking to, or understanding the concerns that whistleblowers may have".

The Irish Examiner subsequently published a series of text messages between one of the whistleblowers and then-Chief Whip Regina Doherty sent in January 2016. Doherty forwarded a text message onto one of the whistleblowers that she said came from Coveney, in which he said he would call this whistleblower the next day. The call never took place.

Speaking in the Dáil on the revelations, Fianna Fáil leader Micheál Martin described the Government handling of the whistleblowers' complaints as 'a scandal'.

Minister for Housing, Planning, Community and Local Government: 2016–17
On 6 May 2016, Coveney was appointed the new Minister for Housing, Planning, Community and Local Government, with Taoiseach Enda Kenny taking over the Defence portfolio and Fine Gael TD Michael Creed becoming the new Minister for Agriculture.

Fine Gael leadership election: 2017
On 2 June 2017, Coveney lost the 2017 Fine Gael leadership election to Leo Varadkar, despite gaining the support of 65% of party members (party members only had 25% of the vote in Fine Gael's electoral college). The winner was expected to succeed Enda Kenny as Taoiseach. On 13 June 2017, it was announced that he would be the deputy leader of the party.

Minister for Foreign Affairs and Trade: 2017–2022

After Leo Varadkar was appointed Taoiseach, by the President of Ireland, as part of his new cabinet, Coveney was appointed Minister for Foreign Affairs and Trade, with special responsibilities for Brexit. Coveney replaced Charles Flanagan, who became Minister for Justice and Equality. It was understood Coveney heavily lobbied Varadkar for the role as he wanted a large role on Brexit. In his capacity as Minister, he has also been co-chairing the European People's Party (EPP) Justice and Home Affairs Ministers Meeting since 2018, alongside Esteban González Pons.

According to Lawrence Franklin of the Gatestone Institute, within the Irish government, Coveney opposes the Control of Economic Activity (Occupied Territories) Bill to ban goods produced in Israeli settlements. He has expressed concern that the bill might contravene EU trade law.

In July 2020, he was re-appointed as Minister for Foreign Affairs. The Trade part of the portfolio was transferred to another government department.

On 25 March 2022, Coveney was giving a speech in Belfast when he forced to leave the stage, following the discovery of a "suspect device" in a hjacked van in the carpark. Coveney had been speaking following a meeting with the John and Pat Hume Foundation.

Coveney and Ireland's ambassador to Ukraine Thérèse Healy visited Ukraine on 13 April 2022 where Coveney met his counterparts, Ukraine foreign minister Dmytro Kuleba and defence minister Oleksii Reznikov, in Kyiv  and visited the site of the Bucha massacre the following day. Coveney travelled via Poland and was the first foreign minister on the UN Security Council to visit Ukraine since the Russian invasion began in February. He was also accompanied by a political adviser and a protection team.

On 20 May 2022, Coveney took over from Luigi Di Maio as chairman of the Council of Europe's Committee of Ministers. He will serve in this role until November 2022.

Tánaiste
On 30 November 2017, Leo Varadkar named Coveney as the new Tánaiste, replacing Frances Fitzgerald.

Brexit negotiations
On 27 January 2019, Coveney in an interview with Andrew Marr, said the Irish backstop in the Brexit withdrawal agreement will not be changed. He said the backstop was already a pragmatic compromise between the United Kingdom and the European Union to avoid infrastructure on the Irish border, that there was no sensible legally-sound alternative to the backstop, and that the European Parliament would not ratify a Brexit withdrawal agreement without the backstop in it.

COVID-19 pandemic
As Minister for Foreign Affairs, Coveney headed up the response to the COVID-19 pandemic on behalf of the Government of Ireland. On 10 March 2020, he upgraded travel advice recommending that Irish citizens do not travel to Italy. He added that people should think carefully about unnecessary public gatherings and urged the public to play their part and help themselves by following advice and doing practical things like sneezing and washing hands properly.

Katherine Zappone controversy

In July 2021, Coveney found himself embroiled in a political scandal relating to the appointment of former Fine Gael Minister Katherine Zappone as a special envoy to the UN. During a cabinet meeting of the coalition government, Coveney proposed Zappone for the role without having previously discussed the matter with Taoiseach Micheál Martin. Martin expressed concerns about the appointment but ultimately allowed it. Subsequently, it emerged that Coveney had not advertised or offered the role to anyone but Zappone, and that in the run-up to the appointment, Zappone had hosted an event at the Merrion Hotel in breach of COVID-19 regulations for many members of the political establishment, including Tánaiste Leo Varadkar. In response, many opposition parties accused the appointment as being a product of cronyism. As a result of the controversy, Zappone later declined to take up the role. In September, Coveney admitted that he had deleted texts from his phone in relation to the Zappone affair. Coveney gave a number of reasons for deleting the texts, including that he had deleted them for more storage space, and for security reasons as his phone had previously been "hacked". Coveney's explanations were criticised by many members of the Dáil, including by members of government coalition members Fianna Fáil. Senator Catherine Ardagh of Fianna Fáil stated it "beggars belief that important text messages related to work matters would be deleted" while Fianna Fáil TD James Lawless said "Modern phones have ample storage without having to frequently delete. I would also question to what extent is there an obligation on those subject to Freedom of Information to retain such information".

On 15 September, upon the return of Dáil Éireann from a summer recess, a motion of no confidence was brought forward by Sinn Féin against Coveney as a direct result of the Zappone appointment and his subsequent handling of the affair in the aftermath of the details becoming public. Regardless, Coveney survived the motion 92 votes to 59 as the government parties enforced the whip on the vote, while Independent TDs generally sided with the government on the vote as well.

Minister for Enterprise, Trade and Employment: 2022–present
On 17 December 2022, Coveney was appointed Minister for Enterprise, Trade and Employment in a cabinet reshuffle after Leo Varadkar's appointment as Taoiseach.

Personal life
Coveney married his long-time girlfriend Ruth Furney, an IDA Ireland employee, in July 2008. They have three daughters and live in Carrigaline in Cork.

See also
Families in the Oireachtas

References

External links

Simon Coveney's page on the Fine Gael website
Coveney authored reports on Human Rights in the World

1972 births
Alumni of the Royal Agricultural University
Alumni of University College Cork
Fine Gael MEPs
Fine Gael TDs
Irish farmers
Living people
Members of the 28th Dáil
Members of the 29th Dáil
Members of the 30th Dáil
Members of the 31st Dáil
Members of the 32nd Dáil
Members of the 33rd Dáil
MEPs for the Republic of Ireland 2004–2009
Ministers for Agriculture (Ireland)
Ministers for Defence (Ireland)
People educated at Clongowes Wood College
Politicians from County Cork
Ministers for Foreign Affairs (Ireland)
Tánaistí
People educated at Presentation Brothers College, Cork
Ministers for Enterprise, Trade and Employment